Lake Baghdad is one of a collection of salt lakes on Rottnest Island, Western Australia.

Ten percent of the area of Rottnest Island is taken up by salt lakes with Lake Baghdad, Herschel Lake, Garden Lake, Government House Lake and others being permanent and having their own surrounding beaches.

See also

 Geographical features of Rottnest Island
 Government House Lake (Rottnest)
 List of lakes of Western Australia

References

Rottnest Island
Saline lakes of Western Australia
Lakes of Perth, Western Australia